Marshall Erdman (September 29, 1922 – September 17, 1995) was a Lithuanian-American builder and colleague of Frank Lloyd Wright.

Life

Early life
Erdman was born Mausas Erdmanas on September 29, 1922, in Tverai, Lithuania. He emigrated to the United States at age 17 to live with an uncle in Chicago.

Education
Following high school, Erdman studied architecture at the University of Illinois at Urbana-Champaign. He joined the United States Army Corps of Engineers in 1943, where he helped build the Remagen pontoon bridge. He returned to his studies after the war,  receiving a B.S. in Political Science from the University of Wisconsin–Madison in 1946.

Career
Erdman started a construction company in 1946, which he incorporated in 1951 as Marshall Erdman & Associates.  An integrated healthcare design-build company, Marshall Erdman & Associates grew rapidly, expanding into six different markets throughout the U.S.  In early 2008, Marshall Erdman & Associates was purchased by Cogdell Spencer, a healthcare real estate investment trust, for $247 million.  This part of Marshall's legacy is now traded on the NYSE as CSA.

In addition to founding Marshall Erdman & Associates, he introduced U-Form-It prefabricated house kits to the market in 1953 and Techline office furniture in 1969.

Legacy
The Middleton Hills neighborhood in Middleton, Wisconsin had its first homes completed in 1996.  This development is considered a Neo-traditional design.

Work

Projects
1949–1950: First Unitarian Society of Madison, designed by Frank Lloyd Wright
1956–1961: Marshall Erdman Prefab Houses, designed by Frank Lloyd Wright
1956–1967: medical offices at Doctor's Park, Madison
1957: Wyoming Valley School, designed by Frank Lloyd Wright
1958: Faith Baptist Church
1959: 100 homes in Sherman Village, Madison
1965–1966: Peace Corps camps at St. Croix and St. Thomas, Virgin Islands.
1965: medical office building, Georgetown, Massachusetts
1974: first modular medical building, Delbarton, West Virginia
1975: first Marshfield Clinic building
1989: Charlotte Memorial Hospital
1993: Middleton Hills planned community, Middleton, Wisconsin

Awards

References

Further reading

External links
Marshall Erdman & Associates
About Marshall Erdman on ASHRAE - Madison, WI chapter website

1922 births
1995 deaths
American construction businesspeople
Lithuanian emigrants to the United States
University of Wisconsin–Madison College of Letters and Science alumni
20th-century American businesspeople